Maureen Patricia O'Hara is an American financial economist. O'Hara is the Robert W. Purcell Professor of Management, a professor of finance, and Acting Director in Graduate Studies at the Samuel Curtis Johnson Graduate School of Management at Cornell University. She has won numerous awards and grants for her research, served on numerous boards, served as an editor for numerous finance journals, and chaired the dissertations of numerous students. In addition, she is well known as the author of Market Microstructure Theory. She was the first female president of the American Finance Association. She has been awarded honorary doctorates from three European universities.

Research
O'Hara's research focuses on issues in market microstructure, and she is the author of Market Microstructure Theory as well as numerous journal articles. Her most recent research has focused on high frequency market microstructure, bond market microstructure, the impact of transparency on trading system performance, listing and delisting issues in securities markets, block chains and cryptocurrencies, and the role of liquidity and information risk in asset pricing. She also works on issues in finance and ethics with her most recent book being Something for Nothing: Arbitrage and Ethics on Wall Street. 

In addition, O'Hara publishes widely on a broad range of topics including banking and financial intermediaries, law and finance, and experimental economics.  Among O'Hara's numerous awards are the CFA Institute's James R. Vertin Award (2020), the American Finance Association 2000 Smith-Breeden Distinguished Paper Award for "When the Underwriter is the Market Maker: An Examination of Trading in the IPO Aftermarket" (with Katrina Ellis and Roni Michaely), 2002 Smith-Breeden Distinguished Paper Award for "Is Information Risk a Determinant of Asset Returns?" (with David Easley, and Soeren Hvidkjaer), and 2003 Smith-Breeden Distinguished Paper Award for "Presidential Address: Liquidity and Price Discovery." Prof. O'Hara is a co-inventor of the VPIN Flow Toxicity metric.

Positions held
O'Hara was the executive editor of the Review of Financial Studies (1999–2005). She has served as president of the Western Finance Association, and as president of the American Finance Association. O'Hara is on the board of trustees of TIAA and was a director of New Star Financial. She has also served as board chair of Investment Technology Group, Inc. (ITG). She has consulted for a number of companies and organizations, including Microsoft, Merrill Lynch, Credit Suisse First Boston, the New York Stock Exchange, Bristol-Myers Squibb, and the World Federation of Exchanges. O'Hara is an advisor to Symbiont, Ava Labs and BMLL Technologies Ltd.

O'Hara has been a faculty member at Johnson, serving as an assistant professor from 1979–1984, associate professor from 1985–1988 and full professor since 1989.  She has held visiting faculty appointments at UCLA, the London Business School, the University of New South Wales, the Hong Kong University of Science and Technology, Cambridge University and the University of Technology Sydney. She earned her BS in economics from the University of Illinois in 1975, her MS in economics in 1976, and her PhD in finance from Northwestern University in 1979.

Selected publications
 Bloomfield, R. and M. O'Hara (2000). "Can Transparent Markets Survive?" Journal of Financial Economics 55(3):425–459.
 Ellis, K., R. Michaely and M. O'Hara (2000). "When the Underwriter Is the Market Maker: An Examination of Trading in the IPO Aftermarket." Journal of Finance 55(3):1039–1074.
 Ellis, K., R. Michaely and M. O'Hara (2002). "The Making of a Dealer Market: From Entry to Equilibrium in the Trading of NASDAQ Stocks." Journal of Finance.
 Macey, J. H. and M. O'Hara (2000). "The Interactions of Law, Finance, and Markets." Journal of Financial Intermediation 9(2): 113–116.
 Macey, J. R. and M. O'Hara, Eds. (2000). Journal of Financial Intermediation v.9( 2) Special Issue on Finance, Markets, and Law. Journal of Financial Intermediation, 9(2) April 2000. Papers Presented as Part of a Symposium on Law, Finance, and Markets Held at Cornell University in May 1999. San Diego, CA, Academic Press.
 Macey, J. H. and M. O'Hara (2002). "The Corporate Governance of Banks." Economic Policy Review (Federal Reserve Banks of New York) (forthcoming).
 O'Hara, M. (2000). "The Future of Stock Markets." TIAA-CREF Investment Forum 4(1):11–12.
 O'Hara, M. (2001). "Designing Markets for Developing Countries." ASIAN Management Review, APFA supplement 7.
Macey, J. H. and M. O'Hara (2016). “Bank Corporate Governance: A Proposal for the Post-Crisis World,”  Economic Review, Federal Reserve Bank of New York, 22(1), 85-106.
Easley, D., M. O'Hara and L. Yang (2016). “Differential Access to Price Information in Financial Markets,” Journal of Financial and Quantitative Analysis, 51(4), 1071 -1111. (Winner of the W. F. Sharpe Award, 2016)
Easley, D., M. O'Hara and M. Lopex de Prado (2016). “Discerning Information from Trade Data,” Journal of Financial Economics, 120 (2), 269 – 286.
Auen, R., A. Krellenstein, M. O'Hara and O. Slama (2017). “Footprints on a Blockchain:  Information Leakage in Distributed Ledgers,” Journal of Trading,  12(2) (Winner of the Peter L. Berstein Award).  Featured in Practical Applications, 6 (2), Fall 2018.
Bao, J., M. O'Hara and X. Zhou (2108). “The Volker Rule and Corporate Bond Market Making in Times of Market Stress”, Journal of Financial Economics, 130 (1), 95-113.
O'Hara, M., Y. Wang and X. Zhou (2018). “The Execution Quality of Corporate Bonds,” Journal of Financial Economics, 130 (2), 308-326.
O'Hara, M., G. Saar and Z. Zhong (2019). “Relative Tick Size and the Trading Environment,” Review of Asset Pricing Studies, 9(10), 47-90.
Easley, D., S. Basu and M. O'Hara (2019). “From Mining to Markets:  The Evolution of Bitcoin Transaction Fees” Journal of Financial Economics, 134(1), 91-109.,

References

External links
 Link to Research Papers
 New Academic Paper Questions Current Market Microstructure Research, 21 May 2014
 
 

Year of birth missing (living people)
Living people
American economists
American economics writers
Johnson School faculty
Northwestern University alumni
University of Illinois alumni
Academic journal editors
Financial economists
Kellogg School of Management alumni
Presidents of the American Finance Association